Billy Scott (October 10, 1948 – April 28, 2017 San Bernardino, California), was an American race car driver. Scott competed in a number of disciplines, including open wheel car, stock car, and drag racing. In 1974–1976, he competed in four races in the USAC Championship Car series, including the 1976 Indianapolis 500 where he finished 23rd in a car owned by Warner W. Hodgdon and named the Spirit of Public Enterprise.

Indianapolis 500 results

External links 
 
 
 

1948 births
2017 deaths
American racing drivers
Indianapolis 500 drivers
Racing drivers from California
Sportspeople from San Bernardino, California